Snap municipal elections were held in Rome on 13–14 and 27–28 April 2008 to elect the Mayor of Rome and 60 members of the City Council, as well as the nineteen presidents and more than 400 councillors of the 19 municipi in which the municipality was divided. The first round of the elections occurred on the same dates of the national general election.

The elections were called just two years after the previous ones since the incumbent mayor Walter Veltroni (PD) resigned on 13 February 2008 to run as the main candidate of the centre-left coalition in the general election.

The centre-right coalition candidate Gianni Alemanno, who was defeated by Veltroni in 2006, faced the incumbent Minister of Culture and Deputy Prime Minister Francesco Rutelli, who had previously hold the position of Mayor of Rome from 1993 to 2001.

Since none of the candidates obtained the majority of votes on the first round, a second round vote was held on 27–28 April 2008. As a result, Gianni Alemanno unexpectedly won nearly 54% of votes on the second round, becoming the first centre-right directly elected mayor of Rome.

Background
Following the fall of Prodi's government in January 2008, Veltroni, as national secretary of the newborn Democratic Party (PD), was chosen to run as the main candidate for the centre-left coalition in the April snap general election and resigned to concentrate on the national campaign.

Mayoral election
The centre-right coalition was led by Gianni Alemanno (PdL). Alemanno rejected a formal alliance with the far-right parties, but his critics emphasized that his victory was greeted by crowds of supporters, among them far right skinheads.

The centre-left coalition was led by Francesco Rutelli, who continued to maintain a huge popularity across the city.

Voting system
The voting system is used for all mayoral elections in Italy, in the city with a population higher than 15,000 inhabitants. Under this system voters express a direct choice for the mayor or an indirect choice voting for the party of the candidate's coalition. If no candidate receives 50% of votes, the top two candidates go to a second round after two weeks. This gives a result whereby the winning candidate may be able to claim majority support, although it is not guaranteed.

For municipi the voting system is the same, not referred to the mayor but to the president of the municipio.

The election of the city council is based on a direct choice for the candidate with a preference vote: the candidate with the majority of the preferences is elected. The number of the seats for each party is determined proportionally.

Parties and candidates
This is a list of the major parties (and their respective leaders) which participated in the election.

Results

Notes

Election in the municipi

Table below shows the results for each municipio with the percentage for each coalition on the first round:

Table below shows the results for each municipio with the percentage for each coalition on the second round:

Source: Municipality of Rome - Electoral Service

References

2008 elections in Italy
Rome
Rome
Elections in Rome
2000s in Rome
April 2008 events in Europe